Bogie bolster may refer to
 the bolster that is part of a bogie (UK) or truck (US), see List of railroad truck parts § Bogie bolster
 a British flatbed railway car that runs on bogies and has baulks of timber (bolsters) fixed across the bed, see Bogie bolster wagon.

See also
 Bogie (disambiguation)
 Bolster (disambiguation)